Edasseri Govindan  Nair (23 December 1906 – 16 October 1974) was an Indian poet and playwright of Malayalam literature. Known as one of the major poets of Malayalam, Edasseri was a recipient of the Sahitya Akademi Award and the Kerala Sahitya Akademi Award for Poetry. He was also a recipient of Asan Smaraka Kavitha Puraskaram, which was awarded posthumously.

Biography 

Edasseri Govindan  Nair was born on December 23, 1906 at Kuttippuram, in Malapuram district in the south Indian state of Kerala to P. Krishna Kurup and Edasseri Kunjukutti Amma in a family with poor financial means. He did not have much formal education due to the death of his father in 1921 when he was only 15 years old and started his career early as an assistant to a relative, who worked in Alappuzha. However, he compensated for the lack of formal education with hard work with voracious reading, learning Sanskrit and English on his own taking help from his friends, constantly engaging in debates on literature, criticism, science, astronomy and  even astrology. He spent 7 years in Alleppey before moving to Kozhikode. In early 1930, he moved to Ponani. It was during this time that he married Janaki Amma, the wedding taking place in 1938. He continued with his learning, debates and discussions in Ponani also.

Edasseri was associated with various literary and cultural forums. He sat in the general council of Kerala Sahitya Akademi, Kerala Sangeetha Nataka Akademi and Samastha Kerala Sahitya Parishad and was a member of the board of directors of the Sahithya Pravarthaka Co-operative Society. He presided Kerala Sahithya Samithi and Kendra Kala Samithi during various periods and was instrumental in founding a local library, Krishna Panikkar Vayana Sala.

Edasseri's works include 19 books and over 300 poems in 10 anthologies, 6 books of plays and a collection of essays. He was among the poets who changed the romantic traits of Malayalam poetry to realism. His narrative style, as shown in his poems such as Poothapattu, Panimudakkam, Kalyana Pudava, Karutha Chettichikal and Kavile Pattu, was reported to reflect strong humanism.

Govindan Nair - Janaki Amma couple had eleven children, though only eight survived infancy. He died on October 16, 1974, at the age of 67.

Awards
Edasseri received two awards from the Government of Tamil Nadu (the known as Government of Madras), the first one for his play, Koottukrishi and the other, for his poem anthology, Puthan Kalavum Arivalum. He received the Kerala Sahitya Akademi Award for Poetry in 1969 for the poem anthology Oru Pidi Nellikka and a year later, Sahitya Akademi awarded him their annual award for 1069 for Kavile Pattu, another of his anthology. He was awarded Asan Smaraka Kavitha Puraskaram posthumously in 1979, five years after his death, for the anthology, Anthithiri.

Literary works

Poem anthologies 

 Alakavali (Ornations)(അളകാവലി) -1940
 Puthankalavum Arivalum Poothappattum (പുത്തൻ കലവും അരിവാളും പൂതപ്പാട്ടും)(New Pot and Sickle) - 1951
 Laghu Ganangal (Simple Songs) - 1954
 Karutha Chettichikal (Dark Nomad Women) - 1955
 Thathwa Shastrangal Urangumbol (As Philosophies Sleep) -1961
 Kavile Pattu (Song of the Grove) - 1966
 Oru Pidi Nellikka (A handful of Gooseberries) - 1968
 Thrivikramannu Munnil (In front of Thrivikrama) - 1971
 Kunkuma Prabhatham (The Vermilion Dawn) - 1975
 Anthithiri (Ritual Wick of Dusk) – 1977
 Edasseriyude Sampoorna Kavithakal (Complete Poetic Works of Edasseri) - 1988
 Malayalathinte Priya Kavithakal (Endearing poems of Malayalam) - 2013.

Plays 

 Noolamala (The Entanglement) -1947
 Koottu Krishi (Co-operative Faming) - 1950
 Kaliyum Chiriyum (Fun and Laughter) - One-act plays- 1954
 Ennichutta Appam ( Limited Means) - One-act plays- 1957  
 Chaliyathi (The Weaver Woman) - One-act plays- 1960
 Njediyil Padaratha Mulla (Jasmine Vine that does not climb the prop) - 1964
 Jarasandhante Puthri (Daughter of Jarasandhan) - Radio Play- 1970s
 Khatolkachan 1970s
 Edasseriyude Naadakangal - 2001

Other books 
 Edasseriyude Prabandhangal (Essays of Edasseri) - 1988
 Edasseriyude Cherukathakal (Short stories of Edasseri) – 2015

Books on Edasseri Govindan Nair
 Edasseri - Navabhavukathwathinte Kavi (Literary criticism by Prof. P. Meerakutty) 
 Edasseri Govindan Nair (book in English on the poet by M. Leelavathi)
 Edasseriyude Kavyalokam (book on Edasseri poems by K. P. Saraschandran)
 Itha Oru Kavi (essays on Edasseri by eminent writers)
 Edasserikkavitha - Shilpavicharam by K. P. Mohanan
 Edasserikkavitha - a collection of essays by various writers compiled by Kavadayar Ramachandran
 Edasseri Ninavil Varumpol - (Essays on Edasseri)
 Edasserikkavitha (Literary criticism by Melath Chandrasekharan)
 Edasserikavithayile Premeyaghatana (Literary criticism by Chathanath Achuthanunni)

Notes

References

External links
 
 
 
 
 

1906 births
Indian male poets
Malayalam-language writers
1974 deaths
Recipients of the Sahitya Akademi Award in Malayalam
Malayalam poets
Recipients of the Kerala Sahitya Akademi Award
20th-century Indian poets
Poets from Kerala
People from Malappuram district
20th-century Indian male writers
Indian dramatists and playwrights